Izz ad-Din Abd al-Qadar ibn Mustafa ibn Yusuf ibn Muhammad al-Qassam (1881 or 19 December 1882 – 20 November 1935) was a Syrian Muslim preacher, and a leader in the local struggles against British and French Mandatory rule in the Levant, and a militant opponent of Zionism in the 1920s and 1930s.

Al-Qassam studied at Al-Azhar University in Egypt and afterward became an Islamic revivalist preacher in his hometown of Jableh in Syria during the last years of Ottoman rule. Following his return, he became an active supporter of the Libyan resistance to Italian rule, raising funds and fighters to aid the Libyans and penning an anthem for them. He would later lead his own group of rebels in alliance with Ibrahim Hananu to fight against French Mandatory forces in northern Syria in 1919–20.

Following the rebels' defeat, he immigrated to Palestine, where he became a Muslim waqf (religious endowments) official and grew incensed at the plight of Palestinian Arab peasants. In the 1930s, he formed bands of local fighters and launched attacks against British and Jewish targets. He was eventually killed in a manhunt following his alleged role in the killing of a British policeman. Israeli historian Tom Segev has called him 'the Arab Joseph Trumpeldor'. His campaign and death were factors that led to the 1936–1939 Arab revolt in Palestine.

Early life and Muslim scholarship

Al-Qassam was born in Jableh, northwestern Syria, to father Abd al-Qadar, a Sharia court official during Ottoman rule and a local leader of the Qadariyya Sufi order. His grandfather had been a leading sheikh of the Qadariyya order and moved to Jableh from Iraq. Al-Qassam also followed the Hanafi fiqh (school of jurisprudence) of Sunni Islam and studied at the local Istambuli Mosque under the teaching of well-known ′alim (scholar) Sheikh Salim Tayarah.

Sometime between 1902 and 1905, al-Qassam left for Cairo to study at the al-Azhar Mosque. Who he studied with is disputed by sources; some accounts say he studied under the Muslim reformist scholar Muhammad Abduh and came into contact with the prominent proto-Salafist, Rashid Rida, who himself studied under Abduh, while others are skeptical of al-Qassam's relationships with either. However, the attitude al-Qassam later adopted toward the political issues in the Arab world suggests he was well-acquainted with the ideas Abduh and Rida espoused. At al-Azhar, al-Qassam developed the thinking that would guide his future activism. Critical of a stagnant Islam, he preached among the ranks of farmers and other locals about the necessity for a modern Islam, one capable of defending itself from Western colonialism through jihad (holy struggle). He returned to Jableh in 1909 as an ′alim and worked as a teacher at a Qadariyya madrasa (Islamic school) where he taught both the mystical practices of the Qadariyya Sufi order and the jurisprudence and commentary of the Qur'an. In addition he preached as the imam of the Ibrahim Ibn Adham Mosque.

Following his return to Jableh, al-Qassam commenced a program of Islamic revival based on moral reforms which included the encouragement of maintaining regular salaah (prayer) and the sawm (fasting) during Ramadan as well as advocating an end to gambling and alcohol consumption. Al-Qassam's campaign highly influenced Jableh's residents who increasingly adopted his reforms. He developed amiable relations with the local Ottoman police who he would call upon to enforce Sharia law on rare cases of major violations. In some occasions, he would send disciples as vigilantes to intercept caravans transporting alcohol which would then be disposed of. Despite the support for Arab nationalism from some of his fellow alumni at al-Azhar and among Syrian notables, al-Qassam's loyalties most likely laid with the Ottoman Empire as his relationship with the authorities would indicate. He was well-regarded among much of Jableh's population where he gained a reputation for piety, simple manners and good humor.

Support for Libyan resistance

Following Italy's September 1911 invasion of Libya, al-Qassam began collecting funds in Jableh for the joint Ottoman-Libyan resistance movement and composed a victory anthem. Jableh's district governor sought to gain control over the fundraiser and when locals nevertheless continued to send their donations to al-Qassam, he attempted to have him jailed. The district governor alleged that al-Qassam was working against the Ottoman state, but an official investigation found him not guilty and the governor was consequently dismissed.

In June 1912, during one of his Friday prayer sermons, he called for volunteers to engage in a jihad against the Italians. Accepting only volunteers with prior Ottoman military training, al-Qassam enlisted dozens of volunteers and set up a fund for the expedition to Libya as well as a small pension for the families of volunteers while they were abroad. Although accounts vary, al-Qassam was accompanied by 60 to 250 volunteers known as mujahideen (those who engage in jihad) when he arrived in Alexandretta in the latter part of that year. Intending to gain sea transportation from the Ottomans, al-Qassam's request was rejected by the authorities who ordered him and his men back to Jableh. A new Ottoman government in Istanbul had gained power and shifted the state's focus to the Balkan front in October, abandoning the Libyan resistance. Part of the money that was raised was then used to establish a madrasa in Jableh while the remainder was saved for future efforts.

Anti-French resistance in Syria

He later enlisted in the Ottoman army when World War I broke out, where he received military training and was attached as a chaplain to a base near Damascus. Returning to Jableh before the war's end, al-Qassam used funds from his planned expedition to Libya to organize a local defense force to fight the French occupation. His principal role in the local resistance was financing the acquisition of weapons for Jableh's militia. By 1919, French forces moved into the coastal area of northern Syria while Faisal I established the Kingdom of Syria in Damascus as an independent Arab state. During this period, al-Qassam's Jableh militia fought against local French-backed Alawite militiamen who occupied areas around the city. The Alawites were eventually repelled, but French forces moved in soon after to consolidate their control. Consequently, al-Qassam and many of his disciples left Jableh for Mount Sahyun where he established a base near the village of Zanqufeh to launch guerrilla raids against the French Army.

Al-Qassam's militia grew when it was joined by another militia based in the mountains following the death of its commander Umar al-Bitar. However, as the French tightened their control of the area, they were able to successfully pressure several of Jableh's major landowners to drop their financial support for al-Qassam and pay taxes to the French Mandate government. This further isolated al-Qassam who decided to flee Mount Sahyun for Aleppo in May 1920. There he and his fighters joined ranks with Ibrahim Hananu who was leading attacks against the French Army until the latter captured Jisr ash-Shugur in July. As a result of this French victory and the impending capitulation of Aleppo, al-Qassam and members of his unit fled past French Army lines with forged passports to Tartus.

Activism in Palestine

Establishment in Haifa
From Tartus, al-Qassam travelled to Beirut by boat and then to Haifa, then under the British Mandate, where his wife and daughters later joined him. During the early 1920s, al-Qassam taught at the Madrasa Islamiya, an Islamic educational institution with many schools in Haifa and its periphery. It was funded by the Jamiat Islamiya, a waqf (religious endowments) administered by prominent Muslims from the city. Unlike other Muslim scholars, al-Qassam made himself easily accessible to the public and often arrived late to teach his classes because he was frequently stopped by passersby for advice. He resigned from his teaching career due to the school's insistence that he maintain consistent hours. As part of his Islamic revivalist teaching, he denounced and discouraged some local Palestinian traditions, including unorthodox funeral rituals, mothers' visitation to the al-Khidr shrine on nearby Mount Carmel to give thanks for their children's well-being or achievements and tribal dances around religious sites, as superstitious innovations to Islam.

Al-Qassam concentrated his activities on the lower classes, setting up a night school for casual labourers and preaching to them as an imam, first in the Jurayneh Mosque, and later in the Istiqlal Mosque (both of which still exist in Haifa's Lower City). He would seek them out on the streets, in brothels and hashish dens. His greatest following came from the landless ex-tenant farmers drifting into Haifa from the Upper Galilee where purchases of agricultural land by the Jewish National Fund and Hebrew labour policies excluding Arabs had dispossessed many of their traditional livelihoods. Al-Qassam grew increasingly popular with northern Palestine's poorer Muslims and was frequently sought out to preach at Mawlid celebrations.

In 1929 he was appointed the marriage registrar at the sharia court in Haifa by the Waqf authorities in Jerusalem, a role that allowed him to tour the northern villages, whose inhabitants he encouraged to set up agricultural cooperatives. According to the American historian Edmund Burke, al-Qassam was:An individual deeply imbued with the Islamic social gospel and who was struck by the plight of Palestinian peasants and migrants. Al-Qassam's pastoral concern was linked to his moral outrage as a Muslim at the ways in which the old implicit social compact was being violated in the circumstances of British mandatory Palestine. This anger fueled a political radicalism that drove him eventually to take up arms and marks him off from the Palestinian notable politicians.

He also took advantage of his travels to deliver fiery political and religious sermons in which he encouraged villagers to organise resistance units to attack the British and Jews. He intensified his agitation and obtained a fatwa from Shaykh Badr al-Din al-Taji al-Hasani, the Mufti of Damascus, which ruled that the struggle against the British and the Jews was permissible.

Relationship with local leaders

According to Israeli historian Shai Lachman, between 1921 and 1935 al-Qassam often cooperated with Hajj Amin al-Husseini, the Grand Mufti of Jerusalem. They were initially on good terms, and al-Qassam's various official appointments required the mufti's prior consent. He suggests their cooperation increased after the 1929 riots, in which one source claims al-Qassam's men were active. The two fell out in the mid-1930s, perhaps due to al-Qassam's independent line of activism. In 1933, al-Qassam sent an emissary to al-Husseini, requesting the latter's participation in a revolt against the British. At the time, al-Husseini refused, preferring a political solution.

Between 1928 until his death, al-Qassam served as the president of the Young Men's Muslim Association (YMMA) in Haifa. While he focused his activism with the lower classes, his position in the YMMA afforded him access with the middle and educated classes of the city who were attracted to Hizb al-Istiqlal (Independence Party), an Arab nationalist political party. In particular, he developed a strong relationship with leading local party member Rashid al-Hajj Ibrahim, the previous president of the Haifa YMMA. A wide ideological gap between the secularist al-Istiqlal and al-Qassam was bridged by a convergence in the view that the struggle against Zionist expansion in Palestine was inseparable from active opposition to British rule. This view separated al-Qassam and al-Istiqlal from the mainstream political forces in Palestine at the time. While men from al-Istiqlal and the YMMA generally refrained from joining al-Qassam's cause, his association with them helped protect him from political figures who opposed his activism. His activities were also financed by several well-off businessmen associated with al-Istiqlal due to his spreading reputation.

Organisation of armed struggle

In 1930 or 1931, al-Qassam had recruited numerous hand-picked followers and organised them into about a dozen different circles, each group of supporters unaware of the existence of the other groups. The majority of his men were peasants and urban labourers. The majority of al-Qassam's circles were based in northern Palestine, but he had disciples throughout the country, including in Gaza in the south. In contrast to traditional Palestinian leaders who campaigned against Zionist settlement while avoiding confrontation with the British authorities, al-Qassam saw it as a priority to fight against both. He also saw the brewing conflict in Palestine as a religious struggle, unlike most Palestinian leaders who advocated a secular and nationalist response. Al-Qassam advocated a moral, political and military jihad as the solution to end British rule and Zionist aspirations in Palestine.

In training his men, al-Qassam stressed that maintaining good character was of paramount importance. As such, fighters should provide for the needy, aid people with illness, maintain good ties with their families and pray regularly to God. These virtues, he claimed, were prerequisites to being disciplined and fearless fighters. The moral component of al-Qassam's teachings were especially geared towards the young men of Haifa's labour slums who lived away from their families and who were exposed to activities considered immoral in Islam. He viewed marriage as key to preventing the moral corruption of young men and managed to financially aid his more destitute supporters with their wedding expenses. He encouraged his men to grow beards as a sign of their commitment to jihad and to carry a Qur'an with them wherever they went. Although many of his followers had been illiterate, he taught them how to read and write using the Qur'an as their basis for learning. Al-Qassam also asked his fighters to engage in the spiritual exercises practiced by the Qadiriyya Sufi order and to recite Sufi chants before battle.

The guerrilla bands became known as the Black Hand (al-kaff al-aswad), an anti-Zionist and anti-British militant organisation. The idea for such a group appeared to have crystallised after the 1929 riots. From the outset, a split occurred in the movement. One faction led by Abu Ibrahim al-Kabir argued for immediate attacks against British and Jewish targets, while the other faction, headed by al-Qassam, thought than an armed revolt was premature and risked exposing the group's preparations. According to Subhi Yasin, a comrade of al-Qassam, the group's attacks in the north were executed by Abu Ibrahim's group in defiance of al-Qassam, though in 1969, Abu Ibrahim denied this allegation. The Black Hand's ensuing campaign began with the ambush and killing of three members of Kibbutz Yagur on 11 April 1931, a failed bomb attack on outlying Jewish homes in Haifa in early 1932, and several operations that killed or wounded four members of northern Jewish settlements. The campaign climaxed with the deaths of a Jewish father and son in Nahalal, from a bomb thrown into their home, on 22 December 1932.

By 1935, al-Qassam had recruited several hundred men—the figures range from 200 to 800—organised in cells of five men, and arranged military training for peasants. The cells were equipped with bombs and firearms, which they used to raid Jewish settlements and sabotage British-built rail lines. Though striking a responsive chord among the rural poor and urban underclass, al-Qassam's movement deeply perturbed the Muslim urban elite as it threatened their political and patronage connections with the British Mandatory authorities. Following the October 1935 discovery of a clandestine cache of arms in the port of Jaffa apparently originating from Belgium and destined for the Haganah, a Jewish paramilitary force, Palestinian Arab indignation broke out in two general strikes. The arms shipment to the Haganah served as the final impetus for al-Qassam to launch a revolt against the authorities.

Death

On 8 November the body of a Palestine Police constable, Moshe Rosenfeld, was discovered near Ein Harod. Al-Qassam and his followers were believed to have been responsible and search parties set out to capture him. In this context, al-Qassam and twelve of his men decided to go underground and, leaving Haifa, took to the hills between Jenin and Nablus. There they spent ten days on the move, during which they were fed by the residents of villages in the area. The British police manhunt eventually surrounded al-Qassam in a cave near Ya'bad, in the village of Sheikh Zeid. In the long ensuing firefight, al-Qassam and three of his followers were killed, and five captured on 20 November.

The manner of his last stand galvanized Palestinians at the time, according to American historian Abdallah Schleifer:

Surrounded, he told his men to die as martyrs, and opened fire. His defiance and manner of his death (which stunned the traditional leadership) electrified the Palestinian people. Thousands forced their way past police lines at the funeral in Haifa, and the secular Arab nationalist parties invoked his memory as the symbol of resistance. It was the largest political gathering ever to assemble in mandatory Palestine.

To the surprise of the Palestine Police Force, al-Qassam's funeral, which was held at the Jerini Mosque, attracted at least 3,000 mourners, mostly members of the peasant and working classes. His coffin and those of his slain comrades were draped in the flags of Yemen, Saudi Arabia, and Iraq, the only three independent Arab countries at the time. In reaction to al-Qassam's death, strikes were held in Haifa and several Palestinian and Syrian cities. Al-Qassam is buried at the Muslim cemetery at the former Palestinian village of Balad al-Sheikh, now Nesher, a Jewish suburb of Haifa. An obituary for al-Qassam was published in the Egyptian newspaper Al-Ahram on 22 November, eulogizing him as a "martyr" with the following statement: "I heard you preaching from up in the pulpit, summoning to the sword ... Through your death you are more eloquent than ever you were in life."

Legacy
Five months after al-Qassam's death, members of his movement, known as "Qassamiyun" or "Qassamites", also Ikhwan al-Qassam,
(the Brothers of al-Qassam)  under the leadership of Farhan al-Sa'di, al-Qassam's spiritual heir, shot and killed two Jewish passengers on a bus  and shot three Jewish drivers, killing two, in the 1936 Anabta shooting, acts that became major contributing factors in the start of the 1936–1939 Arab revolt in Palestine. Peasant and urban guerrilla factions (fasa'il) led by the Qassamiyun played a significant role in commencing the countrywide revolt. At the start of the revolt, al-Qassam's close disciples al-Sa'di, Abu Ibrahim al-Kabir, and Attiyah Ahmad Awad led fasa'il in the Jenin region, the Upper Galilee and Balad al-Sheikh, respectively.

Al-Qassam, according to Palestinian-American Rashid Khalidi,
played a crucial role in winning the populace away from the elite-brokered politics of compromise with the British, and in showing them the "correct" path of popular armed struggle against the British and the Zionists.

The first Israeli prime minister, David Ben-Gurion, compared the glory that al-Qassam's actions aroused in the 1930s to the fame won in Zionist discourse by Zionist activist Joseph Trumpeldor who died in a battle with Arab forces. Recalling this, Israeli historian Tom Segev has argued that "The terrorists that al-Qassam led and the intifada fighters, more recently, may also be likened to the terrorists that Menachem Begin led."

Although al-Qassam's revolt was unsuccessful in his lifetime, militant organizations gained inspiration from his example. His funeral drew thousands, which turned into a mass demonstration of national unity. The Palestinian fedayeen who emerged in the 1960s saw al-Qassam as their originator. The founders of the Palestinian nationalist armed movement Fatah had initially considered naming their group the "Qassamiyun". Leila Khaled, a well-known member of the Popular Front for the Liberation of Palestine, once stated that her organization began "where al-Qassam left off: his generation started the revolution, my generation intends to finish it."

The military wing of the Palestinian Islamist armed movement Hamas, the Izz ad-Din al-Qassam Brigades, bears his name as does the Qassam rocket, a short-range rocket the group produces and uses.

References

Bibliography

 

1882 births
1935 deaths
20th-century imams
Al-Azhar University alumni
Syrian emigrants to Mandatory Palestine
Guerrillas killed in action
Arabs from the Ottoman Empire
Palestinian militants
People from Beirut vilayet
People from Haifa
People from Jableh
Syrian imams
Syrian Sufis
World War I chaplains
People of the Franco-Syrian War
Syrian Sunni Muslims
Resistance to the British Empire
Resistance to the French colonial empire